The 1974 Auburn Tigers football team under the leadership of head coach Ralph Jordan completed the regular season with a record of 9–2, earning them an invitation to the Gator Bowl against Texas, which they won by a score of 27–3.  They completed the season with a record of 10–2 and were ranked #8 in the AP poll and #6 in the UPI.

Four players were named all-SEC first team for 1974: defensive end Rusty Deen, linebacker Ken Bernich, safety Mike Fuller, and center Lee Gross.

Schedule

Season summary

Tennessee

References

Auburn
Auburn Tigers football seasons
Gator Bowl champion seasons
Auburn Tigers football